The Integrated Visual Augmentation System (IVAS) is a United States Army program to provide infantry with an augmented reality headset, which provides a wide variety of capabilities to soldiers including, but not limited to, digital wide-angle multi-spectral image fusion of solid-state low-light (digital night vision), thermal, and daylight sensing, object outlining emphasis, 3D map and waypoint overlays, a picture-in-picture display of weapons sights, and a Squad Immersive Virtual Trainer that allows them to train against virtual enemies overlaid upon their real-world field of vision.

History

2020 
As of October 2020 the IVAS system was on its third iteration. Previous tests used commercial Microsoft HoloLens 2 headsets which were not resistant to inclement weather. A ruggedized version of the system was tested in late October 2020 at Fort Pickett by some Marines and members of the 82nd Airborne.
The test was to get soldier feedback and refine the system for eventual battlefield use.

In December 2020, United States Congress decided to cut $230 million of the $1.1 billion request for Army's IVAS goggles.

2021 
After nearly 2 years in development, the final IVAS Capability Set 4 system was scheduled to be fielded in 2021. Over 40,000 sets were planned to be issued.

On March 26, 2021, Microsoft was awarded a "fixed price production agreement" by the United States Army to manufacture and supply IVAS headsets. Microsoft will produce headsets for at least 120,000 members of the Army Close Combat Force. The contract is worth up to  dollars.

Also in March 2021, the U.S. Army announced IVAS was testing with mounted soldiers, such as on Bradley Fighting Vehicle and Stryker teams.  By June 2021, the US Army announced it was expanding IVAS tests to include aircrews for helicopters and drones.  In comparison to the $400,000 purely-slaved and aircraft-dependent F-35 helmet that must be custom-built for each pilot, IVAS attaches to any helmet, is estimated to cost $29,205 per unit, and can optionally work independent of the aircraft when the crew dismounts.

In September 2021 an "Adversarial Electronic Warfare and Cybersecurity Test" of IVAS was conducted. 

In mid-October 2021 IVAS "Operational Test and fielding" was moved to 2022. David Patterson, PEO Soldier Director of Public Affairs, said: "The Army intends to continue developing and fielding this revolutionary, first-of-its-kind technology in FY22,"

2022 
In March 2022, considering the numerous technical issues the program encountered, Congress withheld approximately $400 million funding for the program until IVAS completes its initial operation testing and the Program Executive Office Soldier briefs the appropriations committees on the program’s progress. The testing began in May and concluded in late June.

In September 2022, the US Army began accepting 5000 units of the IVAS and was planning to field them, although these units were still early versions of the IVAS and would require future software upgrades. However, in November 2022, the US Army announced a “course correction” to the program, due to soldiers reporting “physical ailments” after using IVAS in the field. The US Army and Microsoft decided to renegotiate their contract and redesign the form factor while still planning to field 10,000 initial units.

References

External links 
 "'We do not want to become war profiteers' — Microsoft employees outraged over Army HoloLens contract" Task & Purpose

United States Army projects